Jessica Martina Liedberg (born October 7, 1969 in Lindome, Gothenburg, Sweden) is a Swedish actress. She is in a relationship with Gustaf Hammarsten. She studied at the Swedish National Academy of Mime and Acting 1989–92.

Selected filmography
1992 - Vi ses i Krakow
1996 - Älvskungen dyker upp
1998 - Waiting for the Tenor
2000 - Tillsammans
2000–2002 - Rederiet (TV)
2004 - Slut
2009 - Bröllopsfotografen
2012 - Kontoret (TV)
2018 - Gråzon (TV)

References

External links

1969 births
Living people
Swedish actresses
People from Gothenburg